Felton James 'Tony' Earls (born January 1942) is an American child psychiatrist and epidemiologist, currently Professor of Social Medicine, Emeritus, Harvard Medical School, and Professor of Human Behavior and Development, Emeritus, Harvard T.H. Chan School of Public Health; and formerly the Blanche F. Ittleson Professor of Child Psychiatry at Harvard Medical School, and an Elected Fellow of the American Association for the Advancement of Science, American Academy of Political and Social Science, American Academy of Arts and Sciences. He is known for a long-term study of the influence of neighbors' willingness to help each other on the neighborhood's crime rate.

References

External references
 Harvard Catalyst profile for Felton James Earls, MD

Living people
Harvard School of Public Health faculty
Fellows of the American Association for the Advancement of Science
Fellows of the American Academy of Arts and Sciences
Harvard Medical School faculty
Child psychiatrists
American anti-poverty advocates
Howard University College of Medicine alumni
Mental health activists
African-American social scientists
Gun violence researchers
1942 births
American psychiatrists
21st-century African-American people
20th-century African-American people
Members of the National Academy of Medicine